Leontopodium leontopodinum is a species of plant in the family Asteraceae. It is native to Bhutan, Nepal, India, Pakistan, Afghanistan and Central Asia.

References

leontopodinum
Plants described in 1928